Virginia Wildlife Management Areas (WMAs) are state-managed protected areas that exist primarily for the benefit of wildlife. They are managed and maintained by the Virginia Department of Wildlife Resources.

Purpose

WMAs in Virginia differ from other state-managed protected areas in that they are solely intended to preserve and improve wildlife habitat, with a particular focus on game animals, and to provide public space for hunting and fishing activities. Other protected areas in the state, such as state parks, state forests, and natural area preserves, may protect habitat but are also expressly managed to provide space for public recreation, research, timber production, and/or rare species conservation.

Land acquisition and maintenance funds for WMAs are ultimately provided by hunters and anglers, through license fees and taxes levied on gear. These fees are collected on a national level through the Pittman–Robertson Federal Aid in Wildlife Restoration Act, and distributed proportionally to individual states. Some WMA lands were originally donated to the state for wildlife purposes, rather than purchased.

Public use and access
Although maintained for the primary benefit of hunters and anglers, other recreational pursuits are permitted within Virginia's WMAs. Hiking, primitive camping, horseback riding, and bird-watching is allowed on many WMA properties. Prohibited activities include swimming, mountain biking, organized sports, and ATV use. Boats, when permitted, must typically be non-motorized.

To utilize WMA land for any purpose, visitors ages 17 or older must possess a valid hunting or fishing permit, or a current Virginia boat registration. In the absence of these documents, visitors must obtain a daily or annual WMA Access Permit that allows entry to WMA lands.

List of Virginia Wildlife Management Areas

The following table lists Virginia's 46 WMAs .

See also
List of National Wildlife Refuges in Virginia

References

External links
Virginia Department of Game and Inland Fisheries: Wildlife Management Areas

 01
Protected areas of Virginia
Environment of Virginia
Hunting in the United States
Recreational fishing in the United States
Tourism in Virginia
Virginia